Live is the sixth EP by American rock band Interpol, and their first in two years since the Interpol Remix EP. It was recorded during a July 2, 2007 show at the London Astoria, on the European leg of their Our Love to Admire world tour, and released by Capitol on November 27, 2007.

Track listing
"Pioneer to the Falls" – 7:40
"Obstacle 1" – 4:09
"The Heinrich Maneuver" – 3:39
"Mammoth" – 4:48
"Rest My Chemistry" – 5:11
"Stella Was a Diver and She Was Always Down" – 6:12

Personnel
Paul Banks – lead vocals, guitar
Daniel Kessler – lead guitar
Carlos Dengler – bass
Sam Fogarino – drums, percussion
Dave Scher –  keyboards, backing vocals

References

External links
Interpol's official website

Interpol (band) EPs
2007 EPs